Bidestan (also Romanized as Bīdestān; also known as Pāistān) is a village in Torud Rural District, in the Central District of Shahrud County, Semnan Province, Iran. At the 2006 census, its population was 272, in 66 families.

References 

Populated places in Shahrud County